Christian Louis Casimir, 2nd Count of Sayn-Wittgenstein-Berleburg-Ludwigsburg (13 July 1725, Berleburg – 6 May 1797, Rheda) was a reigning Count of Sayn-Wittgenstein-Berleburg-Ludwigsburg line of Sayn-Wittgenstein family from 1750 to 1796.

Early life
He was a son of Count Ludwig Franz of Sayn-Wittgenstein-Berleburg (a descendant of Ludwig I, Count of Sayn-Wittgenstein, through his son Count George II) and his wife Countess Helene Emilie zu Solms-Baruth.

Military service
Christian Ludwig Casimir served as an officer in the Hessian army (in the "Waldenheimische Regiment" for William VIII, Landgrave of Hesse-Kassel), took part in the War of the Austrian Succession (in the Pragmatic Army as aide-de-camp (adjutant) of British Field-Marshal Baron Howard de Walden) and was taken captive in Kolberg as a General of the Prussian Army in 1761 during the Seven Years' War in the Russian Empire.

Russian service
Like so many German officers he was offered a commission by the German Peter III of Russia and entered the Imperial Russian Army in 1762.
His last war was the Russo-Turkish campaign of 1769. In command of a brigade of the 2nd Army of Count Nikita Panin, he tried to capture town of Bendery but, in absence of heavy artillery, was unsuccessful. After his transfer to the 1st Army, he proceeded not to take part in the 1770 campaign. In the same (1770) year he resigned his commission, was granted approval and at the same time promoted (common promotion for higher pension retirees) to general-poruchik (lieutenant-general).

Personal life
He was married two times. Firstly, on 13 July 1763 with Countess Amalia Louise Finck von Finckenstein. Secondly, on 14 February 1774 with Princess Anna Petrovna Dolgorukova (1742-1789). All of his seven children, including Ludwig Adolph Peter, Prince Wittgenstein, came from the first marriage:

 Count Paul Ludwig Karl (1764-1790)
 Count Fedrinand (1766-1771)
 Prince Ludwig Adolf Peter zu Sayn-Wittgenstein-Berleburg-Ludwigsburg (1769-1843), married in 1798 to Polish noblewoman Antonia Cäcilie Snarska and had in this marriage 11 children, among them Prince Ludwig zu Sayn-Wittgenstein-Sayn.
 Count Georg Ludwig Alexander (1770-1774)
 Countess Karoline Polyxena Friederike (1765-1766)
 Countess Karoline Luise (1771-1779)
 Countess Amalie Luise (1771-1853), married in 1790 to Count Dorotheus Ludwig Christoph von Keller. They were maternal grandparents of Princess Leonilla zu Sayn-Wittgenstein-Sayn.

References

1725 births
1797 deaths
Christian Louis Casimir
Christian Louis Casimir of Sayn-Wittgenstein-Ludwigsburg
German military personnel of the Seven Years' War
German military personnel of the War of the Austrian Succession